van Emden is a surname. Notable people with the surname include:

Anicka van Emden (born 1986), Dutch judoka
Helmut Fritz van Emden, entomologist
Jos van Emden (born 1985), Dutch cyclist
Richard van Emden (born 1965), English writer
Maarten van Emden (1937 – 2023), Dutch-Canadian computer scientist

Surnames of Dutch origin